The 2021–22 Tercera División RFEF season was the first for the national fifth level in the Spanish football league system. The league has 18 groups like the former fourth tier Tercera División.

Competition format
The group champions were promoted to 2022–23 Segunda División RFEF. 
The next four eligible teams in each group played in the promotion play-offs. 
The champion of each group qualified for 2022–23 Copa del Rey. If the champion was a reserve team, the first non-reserve team qualified would join the Copa.
In each group, at least three teams were relegated to regional divisions; the relegation of each group was configured so that all Tercera División RFEF groups would have 16 teams for the 2022–23 season.

Overview before the season
A total of 320 teams made up the league: 26 relegated from the 2020–21 Segunda División B, 234 retained from the 2020–21 Tercera División, and 60 promoted from the regional divisions.

Groups

Group 1 – Galicia
Teams retained from 2020–21 Tercera División

 Alondras
 Arzúa
 Barco
 Choco
 Estradense
 Deportivo Fabril
 Ourense CF
 Polvorín
 Racing Vilalbés
 Rápido Bouzas
 Silva
 Somozas
 Viveiro

Teams promoted from 2020–21 Preferente de Galicia

 Atlético Arnoia
 Juvenil Ponteareas
 Noia
 Sofán

Teams and locations

League table

Group 2 – Asturias
Teams retained from 2020–21 Tercera División

 Caudal
 Colunga
 Gijón Industrial
 L'Entregu
 Lenense
 Llanes
 Mosconia
 Navarro
 Praviano
 Real Titánico
 San Martín
 Tuilla
 Urraca

Teams relegated from 2020–21 Segunda División B

 Covadonga
 Lealtad
 Oviedo Vetusta
 Sporting Gijón B

Teams promoted from 2020–21 Regional Preferente

 Langreo B
 Luarca
 Roces

Teams and locations

League table

Group 3 – Cantabria
Teams retained from 2020–21 Tercera División

 Atlético Albericia
 Barreda
 Cartes
 Castro
 Escobedo
 Gimnástica Torrelavega
 Guarnizo
 Sámano
 Selaya
 Siete Villas
 Textil Escudo
 Torina
 Vimenor

Teams promoted from 2020–21 Regional Preferente

 Colindres
 Naval
 Noja

Teams and locations

League table

Group 4 – Basque Country
Teams retained from 2020–21 Tercera División

 Anaitasuna
 Aurrerá Ondarroa
 Basconia
 Beasain
 Cultural Durango
 Deusto
 Lagun Onak
 Pasaia
 San Ignacio
 Santutxu
 Tolosa
 Urduliz
 Vitoria

Teams relegated from 2020–21 Segunda División B

 Alavés B
 Barakaldo
 Leioa
 Portugalete

Teams promoted from 2020–21 División de Honor

 Amurrio
 Beti Gazte
 Uritarra

Teams and locations

League table

Group 5 – Catalonia

Teams retained from 2020–21 Tercera División

 Castelldefels
 Figueres
 Girona B
 Grama
 Granollers
 Manresa
 Pobla Mafumet
 Peralada
 San Cristóbal
 Sant Andreu
 Sants
 Vilafranca
 Vilassar de Mar

Teams relegated from 2020–21 Segunda División B

 L'Hospitalet
 Olot

Teams promoted from 2020–21 Primera Catalana

 Ascó
 Guineueta

Teams and locations

League table

Group 6 – Valencian Community
Teams retained from 2020–21 Tercera División

 Acero
 Atlético Saguntino
 Benigànim
 Elche Ilicitano
 Hércules B
 Jove Español
 Olímpic Xàtiva
 Recambios Colón
 Roda
 Silla
 Torrent
 Villajoyosa
 Villarreal C

Teams relegated from 2020–21 Segunda División B

 Atzeneta
 Orihuela
 Valencia Mestalla

Teams promoted from 2020–21 Regional Preferente

 Athletic Torrellano
 Callosa Deportiva
 Castellón B

Teams and locations

League table

Group 7 – Community of Madrid
Teams retained from 2020–21 Tercera División

 Alcalá
 Alcorcón B
 Carabanchel
 Complutense
 Fuenlabrada Promesas 
 Moratalaz
 Paracuellos Antamira
 Parla
 Pozuelo de Alarcón
 Rayo Vallecano B
 Torrejón
 Trival Valderas
 Villaverde San Andrés

Teams relegated from 2020–21 Segunda División B

 Atlético Madrid B
 Getafe B
 Las Rozas

Teams promoted from 2020–21 Preferente de Madrid

 Galapagar
 Moscardó
 Tres Cantos
 Ursaria
 Villaviciosa de Odón

Teams and locations

League table

Group 8 – Castile and León
Teams retained from 2020–21 Tercera División

 Almazán
 Arandina
 Atlético Astorga
 Atlético Bembibre
 Atlético Tordesillas
 Ávila
 Colegios Diocesanos
 Júpiter Leonés
 La Virgen del Camino
 Mirandés B
 Numancia B
 Salamanca B
 Santa Marta

Teams relegated from 2020–21 Segunda División B

 Guijuelo

Teams promoted from 2020–21 Primera Regional

 Ciudad Rodrigo
 Palencia
 Ribert

Teams and locations

League table

Group 9 – Eastern Andalusia and Melilla

Teams retained from 2020–21 Tercera División

 Alhaurín de la Torre
 Alhaurino
 Almería B
 Atlético Malagueño
 Atlético Porcuna
 Ciudad de Torredonjimeno
 El Palo
 Huétor Tájar
 Huétor Vega
 Jaén
 Juventud Torremolinos
 Motril
 Torreperogil

Teams relegated from 2020–21 Segunda División B

 Marbella

Teams promoted from 2020–21 División de Honor

 San Pedro
 Torre del Mar

Teams promoted from 2020–21 Preferente de Melilla

 Intergym Melilla

Teams and locations

League table

Group 10 – Western Andalusia and Ceuta
Teams retained from 2020–21 Tercera División

 Atlético Antoniano
 Cabecense
 Ciudad de Lucena
 Conil
 Córdoba B
 Gerena
 Los Barrios
 Pozoblanco
 Puente Genil
 Rota
 Sevilla C
 Utrera
 Xerez

Teams relegated from 2020–21 Segunda División B

 Recreativo

Teams promoted from 2020–21 División de Honor

 Cartaya
 Tomares

Teams promoted from 2020–21 Preferente de Ceuta

 Ceuta B

Teams and locations

League table

Group 11 – Balearic Islands
Teams retained from 2020–21 Tercera División

 Binissalem
 Collerense
 Constància
 Felanitx
 Llosetense
 Mallorca B
 Manacor
 Platges de Calvià
 Portmany
 Sant Jordi
 Sant Rafel
 Santanyí
 Sóller

Teams relegated from 2020–21 Segunda División B

 Poblense

Teams promoted from 2020–21 Regional

 Campos
 Inter Ibiza
 Mercadal
 Murense
 Rotlet Molinar
 Serverense
 Son Verí

Teams and locations

League table

Group 12 – Canary Islands
Teams retained from 2020–21 Tercera División

 Arucas
 Atlético Paso
 Buzanada
 Gran Tarajal
 La Cuadra
 Lanzarote
 Las Palmas C
 Santa Úrsula
 Tenerife B
 Tenisca
 Unión Viera
 Vera
 Villa de Santa Brígida

Teams relegated from 2020–21 Segunda División B

 Marino

Teams promoted from 2020–21 Interinsular Preferente

 Herbania
 Las Zocas
 Unión Sur Yaiza

Teams and locations

League table

Group 13 – Region of Murcia
Teams retained from 2020–21 Tercera División

 Bullense
 Cartagena B
 Cartagena FC
 Ciudad de Murcia
 El Palmar
 Huércal-Overa
 La Unión Atlético
 Los Garres
 Mazarrón
 Minera
 Murcia Imperial
 Racing Murcia
 UCAM Murcia B

Teams relegated from 2020–21 Segunda División B

 Lorca Deportiva
 Yeclano

Teams promoted from 2020–21 Preferente Autonómica

 Archena Sport
 Bala Azul
 Caravaca

Teams and locations

League table

Group 14 – Extremadura
Teams retained from 2020–21 Tercera División

 Aceuchal
 Arroyo
 Azuaga
 Calamonte
 Diocesano
 Extremadura B
 Jerez
 Llerenense
 Miajadas
 Moralo
 Olivenza
 Plasencia
 Trujillo

Teams promoted from Regional Preferente

 Badajoz B
 Don Álvaro
 Villafranca

Teams and locations

League table

Group 15 – Navarre

Teams retained from 2020–21 Tercera División

 Atlético Cirbonero
 Beti Kozkor
 Beti Onak
 Burladés
 Cantolagua
 Corellano
 Cortes
 Egüés
 Huarte
 Murchante
 Pamplona
 Subiza
 Txantrea

Teams promoted from 2020–21 Primera Autonómica

 Avance
 Azkoyen
 Gares

Teams and locations

League table

Group 16 – La Rioja
Teams retained from 2020–21 Tercera División

 Agoncillo
 Alfaro
 Anguiano
 Arnedo
 Atlético Vianés
 Berceo
 Calahorra B
 Casalarreina
 La Calzada
 Oyonesa
 River Ebro
 Varea
 Yagüe

Teams relegated from 2020–21 Segunda División B

 Haro

Teams promoted from 2020–21 Regional Preferente

 Cenicero
 Rapid

Teams and locations

League table

Group 17 – Aragon

Teams retained from 2020–21 Tercera División

 Atlético Monzón
 Barbastro
 Belchite 97
 Binéfar
 Borja
 Calamocha
 Cariñena
 Cuarte
 Deportivo Aragón
 Épila
 Illueca
 Robres
 Utebo

Teams promoted from 2020–21 Regional Preferente

 Biescas
 Caspe
 Giner Torrero
 Santa Anastasia

Teams and locations

League table

Group 18 – Castilla–La Mancha
Teams retained from 2020–21 Tercera División

 Almansa
 Atlético Albacete
 Azuqueca
 Conquense
 Guadalajara
 Huracán Balazote
 Illescas
 La Roda
 Manchego
 Quintanar del Rey
 Tarancón
 Torrijos
 Villacañas

Teams relegated from 2020–21 Segunda División B

 Villarrobledo
 Villarrubia

Teams promoted from 2020–21 Primera Autonómica Preferente

 Hogar Alcarreño
 Miguelturreño
 San Clemente

Teams and locations

League table

Copa del Rey qualification
25 teams qualified for the 2022–23 Copa del Rey: the best teams in each group (excluding reserves) and the 7 best second-placed teams ranked by their points coefficient. Should any second-placed team among these 7 qualify already as the best non-reserve team in its group, a ranking of third-placed teams would fill the remaining vacants.

Ranking of second-placed teams

See also
2021–22 La Liga
2021–22 Segunda División
2021–22 Primera División RFEF
2021–22 Segunda División RFEF

References

External links
Royal Spanish Football Federation website

 
Spain